Pink Noise is the third studio album by the British singer Laura Mvula, released on 2 July 2021 by Atlantic Records. Its release was five years after The Dreaming Room, released in 2016. The album was preceded by the singles "Safe Passage" and "Church Girl", the latter being issued along with the album's announcement.

Background
Mvula called the album the one she "always wanted to make", and described it as "made with warm sunset tones of the '80s", saying it "took three years of waiting and waiting and fighting and dying and nothingness and then finally an explosion of sound".

The album follows the 1/f EP, released in February 2021. The EP was named after the technical name for pink noise on the frequency spectrum.

Track listing

Notes
  signifies an additional producer

Charts

References

2021 albums
Atlantic Records albums
Laura Mvula albums